Carlos Javier López (born March 19, 1980 in Rosario, Argentina) is a former Argentine footballer.

Career
In October 2015, López signed for NorthEast United FC in the Indian Super League, as a replacement for the injured Kondwani Mtonga, until the end of the season.

On 1 January 2016, López returned to Deportivo Anzoátegui.

References

External links
 
 

1980 births
Argentine footballers
Argentine expatriate footballers
Central Córdoba de Rosario footballers
Tiro Federal footballers
Aldosivi footballers
FC Vaduz players
Argentine expatriate sportspeople in Liechtenstein
Expatriate footballers in Liechtenstein
C.F. Pachuca players
Club Blooming players
Deportivo Miranda F.C. players
Deportivo Anzoátegui players
Estudiantes de Mérida players
Deportes Concepción (Chile) footballers
Chilean Primera División players
Liga MX players
Living people
Association football defenders
Footballers from Rosario, Santa Fe